WGSL (104.9 FM) is a radio station broadcasting a contemporary Christian format. Licensed to La Crosse, Wisconsin, United States, the station serves the La Crosse area. The station is currently owned by The Salvation Poem Foundation.

Originally WLXR-FM, the station changed its call sign to WGSL on July 31, 2020, coinciding with the sale of the station by Mississippi Valley Broadcasters to The Salvation Poem Foundation. On August 1, 2020, the station's Hot AC format moved from 104.9 to translator 97.9 K250AZ (which relays WKBH-HD2). Simultaneously, the 104.9 frequency switched to the "Prayz Network" contemporary Christian format. Prior to its former Hot AC format, the station was La Crosse's dominant CHR station in the 1980s.

References

External links

GSL
Contemporary Christian radio stations in the United States
Radio stations established in 1975
1975 establishments in Wisconsin